The Official Marvel Index is a series of comic books released by Marvel Comics which featured synopses of several Marvel series. The books were largely compiled by George Olshevsky (who was for fourteen years the sole owner of a complete collection of Marvel superhero comics dating from Marvel Comics #1, published in 1939), and featured detailed information on each issue in a particular series, including writer and artist credits, characters who appeared in the issue, and a story synopsis. A similar series of indices was published for DC Comics.

Publication history 
The Official Marvel Index was preceded by the Marvel Comics Index (also compiled by Olshevsky) and distributed by Pacific Comics Distributors sporadically from 1976 to 1982. These books were magazine-sized as opposed to comic-sized.

The first Official Marvel Index titles were published in 1985, and produced regularly through August 1988. A second series of two titles was published in 1994–1995.

In 2008, Marvel announced that a new Marvel Index series would commence publication in 2009. Titled Official Index to the Marvel Universe, the first issue was published in January 2009, with a monthly release schedule. The new series focuses primarily on Marvel's most prominent characters. The first volume ran 14 issues and focused on Spider-Man, Iron Man and the X-Men. The second volume began in May 2010 and focused on the Avengers, Captain America (including Golden Age issues) and Thor (including Journey into Mystery, where Thor premiered). A third started in August 2011, focusing on Wolverine, The Punisher, and Ghost Rider.  Each featured title is later collected separately into a digest-sized trade paperback with additional issues not featured in the monthly book.

Bibliography of Marvel Index series

The Marvel Comics Index 
Published by Pacific Comics Distributors 1976 - 1982

The Official Marvel Index Vol. I 
Published by Marvel Comics 1985 - 1988

The Official Marvel Index Vol. II 
Published by Marvel Comics 1994 - 1995

Official Index to the Marvel Universe 
Published by Marvel Comics 2009 - 2012

{| class="wikitable"
|+Official Index to the Marvel Universe: The Avengers, Thor and Captain America #1 - 15
|-
!#!!Synopses!!Month of publ.!!Pages!!Orig. price

|- align="center"
|1||align="left"|The Avengers: The Avengers #1-39Captain America: Captain America Comics (1941) #1-5, Captain America #100-128Thor: Journey into Mystery #83-109||align="right"|May 2010||64||$3.99
|- align="center"
|2||align="left"|The Avengers: The Avengers #40-79, Avengers Annual #1 and 2Captain America: Captain America Comics #6-9, Captain America #129-158, Captain America Annual #1 and 2Thor: Journey into Mystery #110-125, Journey into Mystery Annual #1, The Mighty Thor #126-144, The Mighty Thor Annual #2||align="right"|June 2010||64||$3.99
|- align="center"
|3||align="left"|The Avengers: The Avengers #80-116, Avengers Annual #3-5Captain America: Captain America Comics #10-13, Captain America #159-186, Giant-Size Captain America #1Thor: The Mighty Thor #145-191, Tales of Asgard #1, The Mighty Thor Annual #3||align="right"|July 2010||64||$3.99
|- align="center"
|4||align="left"|The Avengers: The Avengers #117-146, Giant-Size Avengers #1-5Captain America: Captain America Comics #14-17, Captain America #187-216, Captain America Annual #3 and 4, Captain America's Bicentennial BattlesThor: The Mighty Thor #192-237||align="right"|August 2010||64||$3.99
|- align="center"
|5||align="left"|The Avengers: The Avengers #147-181, Avengers Annual #6-8Captain America: Captain America Comics #18-21, Captain America #217-247Thor: The Mighty Thor #238-277, Giant-Size Thor #1, The Mighty Thor Annual #5-7||align="right"|September 2010||64||$3.99
|- align="center"
|6||align="left"|The Avengers: The Avengers #182-218, Avengers Annual #9 and 10Captain America: Captain America Comics #22-26, Captain America #248-273, Captain America Annual #5Thor: The Mighty Thor #278-313, The Mighty Thor Annual #8 and 9||align="right"|October 2010||64||$3.99
|- align="center"
|7||align="left"|The Avengers: The Avengers #219-253, Avengers Annual #11-13Captain America: Captain America Comics #27 and 28, Captain America #274-303, Captain America Annual #6 and 7, Captain America Special Edition #1 and 2Thor: The Mighty Thor #314-357, The Mighty Thor Annual #10-13, Marvel Graphic Novel #33, Tales of Asgard (1984) #1||align="right"|November 2010||64||$3.99
|- align="center"
|8||align="left"|The Avengers: The Avengers #254-288, Avengers Annual #14-16Captain America: Captain America Comics #29 and 30, Captain America #304-337, Captain America Annual #8Thor: The Mighty Thor #358-409, The Mighty Thor Annual #14||align="right"|December 2010||64||$3.99
|- align="center"
|9||align="left"|The Avengers: The Avengers #289-321, Avengers Annual #17 and 18, Avengers Death Trap: The VaultCaptain America: Captain America Comics #31 and 32, Captain America #338-366Thor: The Mighty Thor #410-448, The Mighty Thor Annual #15-17||align="right"|January 2011||64||$3.99
|- align="center"
|10||align="left"|The Avengers: The Avengers #322-347, Avengers Annual #19 and 20Captain America: Captain America Comics #33 and 34, Captain America #367-386, Captain America Annual #9Thor: The Mighty Thor #449-502, The Mighty Thor Annual #18 and 19, Thor: The Legend #1, Journey into Mystery #503-510||align="right"|February 2011||64||$3.99
|- align="center"
|11||align="left"|The Avengers: The Avengers #348-366, Avengers Annual #21Captain America: Captain America Comics #35-36, Captain America #387-414, Captain America Annual #10-11Thor: Journey into Mystery #511-521 and -1, The Mighty Thor (1998) #1-49, The Mighty Thor Annual '99, 2000' and 2001||align="right"|March 2011||64||$3.99
|- align="center"
|12||align="left"|The Avengers: The Avengers #367-395, Avengers Annual #22 and 23, Avengers: The Crossing, Avengers: TimeslideCaptain America: Captain America Comics #37-38, Captain America #415-454, Captain America Annual #12-13, Captain America: The Legend #1, Captain America (1996) #1Thor: The Mighty Thor (1998) #50-85, Thor (2007) #1-12, Thor: Truth of History #1, Thor God-Size Special #1, Thor #600||align="right"|April 2011||64||$3.99
|- align="center"
|13||align="left"|The Avengers: The Avengers #396-402,  The Avengers (1996) #1-13, The Avengers (1998) #1-10, Avengers-Squadron Supreme Annual 1998Captain America: Captain America Comics #39-41, Captain America (1996) #2-13, Captain America (1998) #1-50, Captain America-Citizen V Annual 1998, Captain America Annual 1999-2001, Captain America (2002) #1-27||align="right"|May 2011||64||$3.99
|- align="center"
|14||align="left"|The Avengers: The Avengers (1998) #11-36, Avengers Annual 1999-2000, The Avengers #0 (Wizard magazine supplement)Captain America: Captain America Comics #42-48, Captain America (2002) #28-32, Captain America (2005) #1-50, Captain America 65th Anniversary Special, Fallen Son: The Death of Captain America #1-5, Captain America #600-601,  Captain America: Reborn #1-6,  Captain America: Who Will Wield the Shield?||align="right"|June 2011||64||$3.99
|- align="center"
|15||align="left"|The Avengers: The Avengers (1998) #37-84, Avengers Annual 2001, The Avengers #500-503, Avengers Finale #1, New Avengers  #1-64, New Avengers Annual #1-3, New Avengers Finale||align="right"|July 2011||64||$3.99
|}

 See also 
 Official DC Index
 Official Handbook of the Marvel Universe Official Handbook of the Conan Universe''

References 

Marvel Comics titles
Pacific Comics titles
Magazines about comics
Bibliographic databases and indexes
Catalogues